A Death Cafe is a scheduled non-profit get-together (called "social franchises" by the organizers) for the purpose of talking about death over food and drink, usually tea and cake. The goal of these nonprofit groups is to educate and help others become more familiar with the end of life. The idea originates with the Swiss sociologist and anthropologist , who organized the first café mortel in 2004. Jon Underwood, a UK web developer, was inspired by Crettaz's work and developed the Death Cafe model in 2011. He was instrumental in the spread of the idea.  They have since been held in 66 countries.

Format and location
The death café is not a physical location, but is an event hosted at someone's house or other pop-up/ temporary venue. The official objective of a death café is to help people make the most of their finite lives. Individuals can discuss their understanding, thoughts, dreams, fears and all other areas of death and dying at these events. There have been Death Cafes which specifically create a chance for health/care professionals to talk about death (Miles & Corr, 2015). Generally a death café will have in the region of 12 people gathered in a group discussing death related topics and usually lasts 2 hours (Adler, Remer, Coulter, & Miller, 2015). Tea and cake are one of the most important features of the event, as they assist with creating a nurturing and supportive environment (Underwood, 2015). The concept has spread due to media attention and because of the topic evoking so many different people's thoughts of what death means (Miles & Corr, 2015).

Purpose
The Death Cafe website created by Underwood states the purpose as: Facilitators have said that there is "a need among people to open [the] closet" into which death, the "last taboo", has been placed, to reduce fear and enable people to live more fully. He has said that at these gatherings, "the assembled company, for a moment, and thanks to death, is born into authenticity."

According to one commentator, Crettaz wants to revive the pagan tradition of the funeral feast, "where the living would renew their bonds while letting go of what weighed on their hearts."
The first Paris Cafe Mortel with Crettaz took place in 2010 and Underwood held the first London event in 2011 at his home, subsequently developing the Death Cafe website, generating guidelines with his mother (psychotherapist and Underwood's first Death Cafe facilitator) Susan Barsky Reid, and publicizing the concept which took off globally. The first US event was organized by Lizzy Miles, a hospice worker, in summer 2012 near Columbus, Ohio. By June 2014, the idea had spread to Hong Kong. , over 5,900 have been held worldwide. Venues include homes and rented halls as well as restaurants and cafes; a cemetery and a yurt have also been used. Café Totentanz or Totentanz-Café is used in German-speaking areas. In February 2013, a Death Cafe in London was filmed.

History
Jon Underwood founded Death Cafe based on the ideas of Bernard Crettaz, and held the first Death Cafe in his home in London in 2011, stating that "we have lost control of one of the most significant events we ever have to face." Subsequently, he worked on developing the Death Cafe website, generating guidelines with his mother (psychotherapist and Underwood's first Death Cafe facilitator) Susan Barsky Reid, and publicizing the concept which took off globally.

Crettaz organized the first Cafe Mortel in Neuchâtel in 2004 with the aim of breaking the "tyrannical secrecy" surrounding the topic of death. The first Paris Cafe Mortel with Crettaz took place in 2010. He has written a book on the topic, Cafés Mortels: Sortir la Mort du Silence (Death Cafes: Bringing Death out of Silence).

The first US event was organized by Lizzy Miles, a hospice worker, in summer 2012 near Columbus, Ohio. By June 2014, the idea had spread to Hong Kong. , over 5,900 have been held worldwide. Venues include homes and rented halls as well as restaurants and cafes; a cemetery and a yurt have also been used. Café Totentanz or Totentanz-Café is used in German-speaking areas. In February 2013, a Death Cafe in London was filmed.

Death Cafes have helped to relax the taboo of speaking about death, particularly with strangers, and encouraged people to express their own wishes for after they die. The open-ended discussions also provide an avenue to express thoughts about one's own life stirred up by the death of a family member.

Since Underwood's death on 25 June 2017, Death Cafe is now run by his sister Jools Barsky, mother Susan Barsky Reid and his wife Donna Molloy.  An informative monograph on the movement, its thematic emphases, and its communicative dynamics can be found in The Death Café Movement: Exploring the Horizons of Mortality (2017) by Dr. Jack Fong. As a qualitative study, the work examines how the participants' embrace of self-sovereignty and confrontation of mortality revive their awareness of and appreciation for shared humanity. The analyses of "death talk" draw heavily from Jürgen Habermas theory of communication that proposes how different communication and argumentation styles can be harnessed for seeking answers to major social issues. The findings reveal, however, that no central, key theme that can universally frame mortality surfaced aside from its participants envisioning death as a people, community-oriented experience with rich and diverse themes. Rather than see this as a limitation of Habermas's theory, Fong attributes the findings to the depth of the theme of mortality itself, a depth that inspired the grass roots to engage in all kinds of death talk that attend to living and dying in contemporary society. These are thus the different "horizons" of mortality presented in the work, horizons that enabled café participants to reimagine their birth, life and death in a manner that frees them from systemic narratives.

On April 25, 2015, there took place the First Latino Death Café in the west coast in San Diego.  Belinda Peña is a high school teacher that saw the need in her community to have safe place to talk about Death and Dying. She found Death Café to be fitting to the needs she had identified in her community.   On September 19, 2019, the First Latino Death Cafe in the East Coast took place in Lancaster, PA.  Deborah González, MSW, Bilingual Certified Thanatologist and Bilingual Bereavement Counselor, and Brian Long collaborated and coordinated a Death Café at a local funeral home that brought together for the first time a group of Latinos to talk about End of Life issues and the process of death & dying.

References

Further reading
 Bernard Crettaz. "Cafés Mortels: Sortir la Mort du Silence". Geneva: Labor et fides, 2010. . .
 Jack Fong. The Death Café Movement: Exploring the Horizons of Mortality. London: Palgrave-Macmillan.

External links
deathcafe.com
Totentanz Café.de 

Death customs
Social phenomena
Death-related organizations